The Chibchan water mouse (Chibchanomys trichotis) is a species of rodent in the family Cricetidae.
It is found in the Andean highlands of Colombia, Peru, and Venezuela.
Its natural habitats are tropical cloud forests and streams at elevations from 2500 to 2700 m. It feeds on snails and possibly small fish.

References

Musser, G. G. and M. D. Carleton. 2005. Superfamily Muroidea. pp. 894–1531 in Mammal Species of the World a Taxonomic and Geographic Reference. D. E. Wilson and D. M. Reeder eds. Johns Hopkins University Press, Baltimore.

Chibchanomys
Mammals of Colombia
Mammals of Peru
Mammals of Venezuela
Mammals of the Andes
Mammals described in 1897
Taxa named by Oldfield Thomas
Taxonomy articles created by Polbot